Dame Ingrid Mary Roscoe,  (27 May 1944 – 28 June 2020) was a writer on English art and Lord Lieutenant of West Yorkshire from 2004 to 2018.

Biography
Ingrid Roscoe was born at Rugby School, Warwickshire in 1944 to Arthur Allen and Else, who had married after only meeting three times. Her father died during Ingrid's childhood.  Her mother subsequently married Brigadier Kenneth Hargreaves who would become the last Lord Lieutenant of the West Riding of Yorkshire in 1970 and then the first Lord Lieutenant of West Yorkshire from 1974 to 1978. She had eight grandchildren and was the patron of numerous groups.

Academic career
Roscoe abandoned an English degree at the University of Nottingham to marry Marshall Roscoe at the age of 19 and had three children. She subsequently studied at the University of Leeds, completing a BA in Fine Art and Cultural Studies in 1985 and a PhD in 1990.  Her doctoral thesis on Peter Scheemakers was published by the Walpole Society. 

Roscoe remained at Leeds University in the 1990s as a Lecturer in British Sculpture in the Department of Fine Art.

Publications
Roscoe was editor-in-chief and co-author of A Biographical Dictionary of Sculptors in Britain, 1660–1851, published in November 2009. The book is an update of Rupert Gunnis's Dictionary of British Sculptors 1660–1851 (originally published 1953).

Honours
Roscoe was appointed a Deputy Lieutenant (DL) of West Yorkshire in 1994 and was the north of England's first female Lord Lieutenant when she became Lord Lieutenant of West Yorkshire in 2004.  She retired in 2018.

She was elected as a Fellow of the Society of Antiquaries of London (FSA) in 1993.

She was awarded the Honorary degree of Doctor of Civil Law (DCL) the University of Huddersfield in 2007.

She was awarded the Honorary degree of Doctor of Laws (LL.D) by Leeds Metropolitan University in 2008.

On 15 July 2010 she was awarded the honorary degree of Doctor of Laws (LL.D) by the University of Leeds.

She was made a Dame of Justice of the Order of St John (D.StJ) in 2012.

She received an Honorary Fellowship from Bradford College in 2014.

Roscoe was appointed Dame Commander of the Royal Victorian Order (DCVO) in the 2017 Birthday Honours.

She served as the Honorary Colonel of the University of Leeds Officers' Training Corps.

References

External links
 West Yorkshire Lieutenancy Official Website

1944 births
2020 deaths
People from Rugby, Warwickshire
Alumni of the University of Leeds
Academics of the University of Leeds
English art historians
Women art historians
Lord-Lieutenants of West Yorkshire
British women historians
Dames Commander of the Royal Victorian Order
Dames of Justice of the Order of St John
Fellows of the Society of Antiquaries of London